Dumuria is an upazila of Khulna District in the Division of Khulna, Bangladesh.

History
Ancient Monuments and Antiquities Chenchuri Nilkuthi, Chuknagar Nilkuthi, Madhugram Dak Bungalow.

Historical facts In 1948, the Tevaga movement took place in Sobna, Dhanibunia, Kanaidanga, Orabunia and Bakultala villages of the upazila. During the Liberation War, many Bengalis including Prafulla Kumar Biswas, Indubhushan, Lalchand, Amulya, Mahendra, Raicharan, Nihar and Ratan were martyred in the attack of Pak Army in Kalitalapara in April 1971. In addition, 14 soldiers of the allied forces were killed in the face-off between the liberation forces and the allied forces in Shalua Bazar. Chuknagar village was used as a transit point by the Bengali refugees going to India who were suffering from the atrocities of the Pakistan Army in the early days of the Liberation War. On May 20, 1971, a large number of refugees gathered in Chuknagar were indiscriminately killed by Pak forces. Every year this day is observed as 'Chuknagar Massacre Day'.

Geography
There are two major rivers, Shipsha and Shangrail.

Demographics
According to the 1991 Bangladesh census, Dumuria had a population of 256,503. Males constituted 51.12% of the population, and females 48.88%. The population aged 18 or over was around 138,764. Dumuria had an average literacy rate of 36.1% (7+ years), compared to the national average of 32.4% .

Administration
Dumuria Upazila is divided into 14 union parishads: Atlia, Dhamalia, Dumuria, Ghutudia, Khornia, Magurkhali, Maguraghona, Raghunathpur, Rangpur, Rudaghora, Sahos, Shorafpur, Shovna, and Vandarpara. The union parishads are subdivided into 189 mauzas and 240 villages.

Notable residents 
 Narayan Chandra Chanda, MP (Khulna-5), Honourable Minister of Ministry of Fisheries And Livestock of Bangladesh

See also
Upazilas of Bangladesh
Districts of Bangladesh
Divisions of Bangladesh

References

Upazilas of Khulna District
Khulna Division